Christy Mathewson–Memorial Stadium is a 13,100-seat multi-purpose stadium at Bucknell University in Lewisburg, Pennsylvania. Originally built in 1924, the stadium was renovated and renamed in honor of Mathewson in 1989.  It is home to the Bucknell Bison football team from the Patriot League and the Lewisburg Area High School Green Dragons football team. It is named for Christy Mathewson, a Bucknell alumnus who went on to become a Hall of Fame pitcher for the New York Giants in the early 20th century. Mathewson was on the Walter Camp All-American football team as a kicker while a student at Bucknell.

Notable events

On April 17, 2021 the stadium hosted the first Patriot League Football Championship Game. Holy Cross beat Bucknell 33–10 for the Patriot League Football championship

See also
 List of NCAA Division I FCS football stadiums

References

External links
Christy Mathewson-Memorial Stadium

College football venues
American football venues in Pennsylvania
Multi-purpose stadiums in the United States
Bucknell Bison football
1924 establishments in Pennsylvania
Sports venues completed in 1924
High school football venues in the United States